Dil Toh Happy Hai Ji is an Indian drama television series created by Gul Khan under 4 Lions Films and available on Disney+ Hotstar. The series aired from 15 January to 9 August 2019 on Star Plus and starred Jasmin Bhasin, Donal Bisht, Ansh Bagri and Rohit Purohit.

Plot
Happy Mehra is a free-spirited middle-class girl. Rocky Khosla is a playboy and an arrogant goon. His elder kind-hearted brother Chintu falls in love with Happy and befriends her. Happy constantly fights with Rocky. She and Chintu get married as she learns about his feelings. However, he dies in an accident.

Chintu and Rocky's father, Kulwant blames Rocky and disowns him. Rocky sets up a hotel to fulfill Chintu's dream. Happy joins him; they slowly become friends. Ranvijay Shroff, a dapper famous lawyer fighting for righteousness of society starts falling for Happy. Rocky is falsely accused of molesting Happy's sister, Smiley and jailed for ten years.

3 years later
Happy is running the hotel successfully and has a friendship with Ranvijay. After escaping, Rocky is jealous seeing them together and proves his innocence. He realises his feelings for Happy and decides to confess it. Obsessed with Happy, Ranvijay dies after killing his brother Ranveer and girlfriend Anaya. Happy fakes her death to leave the city. Rocky is heartbroken.

6 years later
Harleen hates their son, Honey as she never wanted a child. Honey runs away and meets Happy who looks after him. She finds out about him being Rocky's son. Rocky learns that Happy is alive. Kumar tries to shoot Honey. Harleen comes in between to save him and dies. Happy proposes Rocky and they get married.

Cast

Main characters
Jasmin Bhasin/Donal Bisht as Happy Saluja - Sandhya and Harshdeep's elder daughter, Smiley's sister, Dinky, Neha, Anjali, Kajal and Rupinder's cousin, Chintu's widow, Rocky's second wife and Honey's adoptive mother.
Ansh Bagri as Rocky Saluja: Madhu and Kulwant's adopted son, Chintu, Simmi and Guggi's foster brother, Harleen's widower, Happy's second husband and Honey's father.
Aru K Verma as Chintu Khosla - Madhu and Kulwant's son, Rocky's foster brother, Simmi and Guggi's brother, Daddu's cousin and Happy's first husband.
Rohit Purohit as Ranvijay "RV" Shroff - Ranveer's brother and Anaya's boyfriend.
Purvi Mundada as Harleen Rocky Saluja - Rocky's first wife and Honey's mother.
Ajinkya Mishra as Honey Rocky Saluja - Harleen and Rocky's son, and Happy's adoptive son.

Recurring characters
Iris Maity as Anaya Grover - Sanjay's daughter and RV's girlfriend.
Geetu Bawa as Sandhya Mehra - Harshdeep's widow, and Happy and Smiley's mother.
Ankushi Gagneja as Smiley Mehra - Sandhya and Harshdeep's younger daughter, Happy's sister, Dinky, Neha, Anjali, Kajal and Rupinder's cousin, and Daddu's fiancé.
Geetanjali Singh as Diana "Dinky" Mehra - Jasvir's daughter, Anjali and Neha's sister, and Happy, Smiley, Kajal and Rupinder's cousin.
Aruna Irani as Sushmita Devi Khosla - Brijwant's widow, Kulwant and Balwant's mother, Chintu, Simmi, Daddu and Guggi's grandmother, and Rocky's foster grandmother.
Satyajit Sharma as Kulwant Khosla - Sushmita and Trilok's elder son, Balwant's brother, Madhu's husband, Chintu, Simmi and Guggi's father, and Rocky's adoptive father.
Rudrakshi Gupta as Madhavi "Madhu" Khosla - Kulwant's wife, Chintu, Simmi and Guggi's mother, and Rocky's adoptive mother.
Sejal Sharma as Simran "Simmi" Khosla - Madhu and Kulwant's daughter, Chintu's sister, Guggi's twin sister and Rocky's adoptive sister.
Khushi Mishra as Gurdeep "Guggi" Khosla: Madhu and Kulwant's daughter, Chintu's sister, Simmi's twin sister and Rocky's adoptive sister.
Minoli Nandwana as Anjali Mehra
Neha Luthra as Neha Mehra
Akshita Vatsayan as Kajal Mehra
Karan Singh Chabbra as Timmi
Shubham Chandna as Sachin
Hitanshu Jinsi as Baldeep Khosla
Karan Taneja as Rupinder Mehra
Manish Khanna as Shyamnik Bhatia
Shresth Kumar as Ranveer Shroff
Akansha Sareen as Sania Shyamnik Bhatia
Anang Desai as Sanjay Grover
Deepali Pansare as Meenu - Kabir's wife
Romanch Mehta as Kabir - Meenu's husband

Development
Talking about her show Dil Toh Happy Hai Ji, Jasmin Bhasin stated, “In a time when supernatural dramas are taking charge, Dil Toh Happy Hai Ji is a slice-of-life story. I have grown up watching such shows and I am sure the audience will love it too. We are making it with full honesty and heart. I am sure everyone will relate to it and enjoy it.”

In June 2019, on introduction of a 6 years leap in storyline, Jasmin Bhasin was uncomfortable playing a mother and thus she was replaced by Donal Bisht. Producer Gul Khan confirmed, "Jasmin was not okay bonding with a child in the show. Even though she had agreed on the story line, on scene level she was uncomfortable. We do not want any actor to be uncomfortable or unhappy while shooting. So we amicably parted ways. We wish her all the best." The show was aired as Happy Hearts on Star Life of Africa

References

2019 Indian television series debuts
Hindi-language television shows
Indian drama television series
StarPlus original programming
Television shows set in Punjab, India
Television series by 4 Lions Films